Cerataulina is a diatom genus.  Cerataulina is similar to another genus of the family Hemiaulaceae, Eucampia. Cerataulina inhabits coastslines and estuaries.  Cerataulina was originally classified as Syringigium in 1980 by Hasle & Syvertsen.

References

Coscinodiscophyceae genera